Shell Bluff Landing is a historic site in Ponte Vedra Beach, Florida, United States. It is part of Guana River State Park. On April 25, 1991, it was added to the U.S. National Register of Historic Places.

References

External links
 St. Johns County listings at National Register of Historic Places
 St. Johns County listings at Florida's Office of Cultural and Historical Programs

Archaeological sites in Florida
National Register of Historic Places in St. Johns County, Florida